Before You Die is a Hindi romantic drama film directed by Suvendu Raj Ghosh and produced by Pradip Chopra. The film  starring Puneet Raj Sharma, Kavya Kashyap, Zarina Wahab, Mukesh Rishi, Pradip Chopra, Mushtaq Khan, Arha Mahajan, Badshah Moitra, Rita Dutta and Lovekansh Garg, is a journey of a girl fighting cancer and her family. It is also a beautiful love story depicting courage and strength. The film is scheduled to be released on 18 February 2022.

Cast
 Puneet Raj Sharma
 Kavya Kashyap
 Zarina Wahab
 Mukesh Rishi
 Pradip Chopra
 Mushtaq Khan

Box office 
As of 28 February 2022, the film grossed 0.15 crore in India.

References

External links
 
 

2022 films
2022 romantic drama films
2020s Hindi-language films